Pandeli Varfi (born 21 September 1949) is member of the Central Election Commission of Albania for the Socialist Party of Albania.

References

Living people
1949 births
People from Vlorë